Pavliuchenkov is a surname. Notable people with the surname include:

Alexander Pavlioutchenkov (born 1985), Russian tennis player
Anastasia Pavlyuchenkova (born 1991), Russian tennis player
Victor Pavlyuchenkov (1963–2021), Russian-Soviet actor and stuntman